"Stand Tough" is a song by British group Point Break. It was released in 1999  on CD single in the United Kingdom through Eternal Records as the second single from their debut studio album, Apocadelic.

The song was used in Australia as the Seven Network's theme for coverage of the AFL and Australian Open tennis in 2000.

Track listing
CD1 (WEA248CD1)
 "Stand Tough"  (radio edit)  – 3:30
 "Stand Tough"  (album version)  – 3:48
 "Stand Tough"  (Tufftown mix)  – 6:01

CD2 (WEA248CD2)
 "Stand Tough"  (radio edit)  – 3:30
 "Stand Tough"  (New Decade Ibiza mix)  – 6:00
 "Stand Tough"  (Tufftown dub)  – 6:02
 "Stand Tough" CD-ROM video – 3:13

Charts

Release history

References

1999 singles
1999 songs
Point Break (band) songs
Sports television theme songs